Maalaala Mo Kaya (abbreviated as MMK), also known as Memories in English, was a Filipino television series, which was first aired on May 15, 1991. MMK is the longest-running drama anthology on Philippine television.

Series overview

Episode list

Season 1 (1991–1992)

Season 2 (1992–1993)

Season 3 (1993–1994)

Season 4 (1995–1996)

Season 5 (1996–1997)

Season 6 (1997–1998)

Season 9 (1999–2000)

Season 10 (2001–2002)

Season 11 (2002–2003)

Season 12 (2003–2004)

Season 13 (2004–2005)

Season 14 (2005–2006)

Season 15 (2006–2007)

Season 16 (2007–2008)

Season 17 (2008–2009)

Season 18 (2009–2010)

Season 19 (2010–2011)

Season 20 (2011–2012)

Season 21 (2013)

Season 22 (2014)

Season 23 (2015)

Season 24 (2016)

Season 25 (2017)

Season 26 (2018)

Season 27 (2019)

Season 28 (2020)

Season 29 (2021)

Season 30 (2022)

References

Lists of anthology television series episodes
Lists of Philippine drama television series episodes
Maalaala Mo Kaya